Luke Jones (born 23 September 1988) is a British Grand Prix motorcycle racer. He races in the British National Superstock 1000 Championship, aboard a Aprilia RSV4.

Career statistics

Grand Prix motorcycle racing

By season

Races by year

References

1988 births
Living people
English motorcycle racers
125cc World Championship riders
FIM Superstock 1000 Cup riders